Ruby Gillman, Teenage Kraken is an upcoming American computer-animated coming-of-age fantasy action comedy film produced by DreamWorks Animation and distributed by Universal Pictures. It is directed by Kirk DeMicco and co-directed by Faryn Pearl, from a screenplay written by Pam Brady and DeMicco, and a story by Brady, Brian C. Brown and Elliott DiGuiseppi. The film features an ensemble voice cast including Lana Condor, Toni Collette, Annie Murphy, Sam Richardson, Liza Koshy, Will Forte, Colman Domingo, Jaboukie Young-White, Blue Chapman, Eduardo Franco, Ramona Young, Echo Kellum, Nicole Byer, and Jane Fonda. In the film, sixteen-year-old Ruby Gillman (Condor) is desperate to fit in at Oceanside High, but when she breaks her mother's (Collette) rule about going on the beach with any would-be friends, Ruby discovers that she is a direct descendant of the warrior Kraken queens and is destined to inherit the throne from her commanding grandmother, the Warrior Queen of the Seven Seas (Fonda).

The film was first pitched to DreamWorks Animation and had been in the works for several years. It was announced in June 2021 as its original title Meet the Gillmans, with casting taking place to play the role, including Condor, Laura Dern, Michael Sheen, and Murphy, and an expected release year of 2022. Paul Tibbitt came on board to direct, with Brady signing on to write the film, and production of the film was expected to start in 2022. The majority of the voice cast members, along with Condor and Murphy's confirmation, were announced in March 2023, along with the new director. Tibbit would quit as director of the film, and DeMicco would take over his position as director with Cilella producing the film.

Ruby Gillman, Teenage Kraken is scheduled to be theatrically released on June 30, 2023.

Premise 
Sixteen-year-old Ruby Gillman learns that she is in the next legendary line of sea krakens. Despite her lofty destiny, she is desperate to fit in at Oceanside High. Ruby struggles even more to fit in when her mother forbids her from going to the beach. After disobeying her mother's rules, she discovers that she is descended from the warrior Kraken queens and will ascend to the throne as the Warrior Queen of the Seven Seas, her grandmother. The krakens are a race sworn to protect the world oceans from the vain, power-hungry mermaids by battling for eons. Ruby would need to embrace herself to fight Chelsea, a mermaid-turned-human who enrolls at Oceanside High School.

Voice cast 
 Lana Condor as Ruby Gillman, a shy sixteen-year-old teenage kraken who is desperate to fit in at Oceanside High
 Toni Collette as Mrs. Gillman, Ruby's overprotective mother who does not allow Ruby to go on the beach with any would-be friends
 Annie Murphy as Chelsea, a snobbish mermaid-turned-human and the new girl at Oceanside High 
 Sam Richardson as Ruby's uncle
 Liza Koshy 
 Will Forte
 Colman Domingo as Mr. Gillman, Ruby's father
 Jaboukie Young-White as Ruby's skater-boy crush, who only seems to admire her for her fractals
 Blue Chapman as Ruby's brother
 Eduardo Franco
 Ramona Young
 Echo Kellum
 Nicole Byer
 Jane Fonda as the Warrior Queen of the Seven Seas, Ruby's grandmother who ascends Ruby to her throne

Production 
According to Animation Magazine, producer Kelly Cooney Cilella stated that the film has been in the works for several years. It was first pitched to the studio DreamWorks Animation about a family of sea monsters that were moved to the land and are hiding in plain sight. She stated: "Our heroine is such a lovable character and I’m so excited for audiences to meet her and fall in love with her the way we have, because she starts the movie as a quirky, slightly insecure but bighearted character, but she’s harboring a secret that she can't tell her friends. But ultimately the kraken is awakened inside her and there’s no hiding this. She learns that her destiny is so much more than being an average high school teenager, and she’s destined to be the next big protector of the seas. Her journey is self discovery and embracing that side of her that had been dormant for so long, and for her to become a fully actualized character was such an exciting story for me to tell on such a grand scale." Director Kirk DeMicco stated that he cited John Hughes films, Easy A (2010), Lady Bird (2017) and Booksmart (2019) as his inspirations. Pierre-Olivier Vincent serves as the production designer, taking inspiration for the main character from the body of an octopus and bringing the "curviness to all the design language of the film", from the cars to the underwater world.

In June 2021, TheGWW reported that a film originally titled Meet the Gillmans was in production at DreamWorks Animation, with casting taking place and an expected release year of 2022. Paul Tibbitt of SpongeBob SquarePants was announced as the director, with Pam Brady confirmed to write the film. Lana Condor, Laura Dern, and Michael Sheen were circled for the roles of Ruby, her mother, and father, respectively, while Annie Murphy was attached to play the role of Clarica. Chris Kuser and Christi Soper will serve as executive producers. Production was also expected to start in 2022. In December 2022, the film's title was revealed as Ruby Gillman, Teenage Kraken.

On March 16, 2023, the cast and crew were publicly announced. Along with Condor and Murphy's roles confirmed, other new cast members of the film include Toni Collette, Sam Richardson, Liza Koshy, Will Forte, Colman Domingo, Jaboukie Young-White, Blue Chapman, Eduardo Franco, Ramona Young, Echo Kellum, Nicole Byer, and Jane Fonda, while DeMicco (replacing Tibbitt), Faryn Pearl, and Cilella were revealed as the director, co-director, and producer, respectively.

Music
Stephanie Economou was confirmed to score the film by the trailer's release on March 16, 2023.

Release 
In December 2022, Deputy Manager Director of Universal Pictures International Italy Massimo Proietti revealed that the film would be released in the summer of 2023. On March 16, 2023, following the release of the official trailer, it was revealed that Ruby Gillman, Teenage Kraken would be released on June 30, 2023, taking the original release date of Illumination's Migration.

References

External links 
 
 

Upcoming films
2020s high school films
2020s American animated films
2020s action comedy films
2020s teen comedy films
2020s teen fantasy films
2020s monster movies
2023 computer-animated films
3D animated films
American high school films
American 3D films
American animated comedy films
American animated action films
American children's animated comedy films
American computer-animated films
American monster movies
American coming-of-age films
American action comedy films
American fantasy comedy films
American fantasy action films
Animated coming-of-age films
Animated comedy films
Animated action films
American fantasy films
Animated films about shapeshifting
Animated teen films
DreamWorks Animation animated films
English-language films
Films about mermaids
Films about shapeshifting
Films about legendary creatures
Films with screenplays by Pam Brady
Films with underwater settings
Kraken in popular culture
Universal Pictures animated films
Universal Pictures films